Damage control is the limiting of damage resulting from an action when damage cannot be avoided. Damage control may also refer to:

Music
 Damage Control (album), by Mat Zo, 2013
 "Damage Control", a song by Man Overboard from Heart Attack
 "Damage Control", a song by John Petrucci from Suspended Animation
 Damage Control (company), a manufacturer of guitar effects pedals and preamps

Medicine
 Damage control surgery, quickly controlling exsanguinating hemorrhage and/or gross contamination using abbreviated interventions

Other
 Damage Control (TV series), a reality television series airing on MTV
 Damage Control (play), by David Auburn
 Damage Control (comics), a comic book limited series published by Marvel Comics, featuring a fictitious company by the same name
 United States Department of Damage Control, in Marvel Cinematic Universe media
 Damage CTRL, a professional wrestling stable in WWE formerly named Damage Control
 Damage control (maritime), the emergency control of situations that may hazard the sinking of a ship.

See also